Chris Weedon (born 1952, Hamburg) is a British academic, and Professor Emerita at Cardiff University.

Life
She graduated from Southampton University and took her doctorate at the University of Birmingham. After her Phd she went into teaching whilst living in the UK and Germany. She joined Cardiff University in 1984.

Her 1987 book Feminist Practice & Poststructuralist Theory has been translated into German and Korean.

In 2010 she announced £4m funding for a project on multiculturalism at Cardiff University. The project would fund four PhD students, and the research would look at the challenges to culture for both white and black citizens. Weedon considered that there were particular complexities for those living in Wales.

Weedon was the chair of the Butetown History & Arts Centre.

Works

Author
Feminist Practice and Poststructuralist Theory ( B. Blackwell, 1987)  2nd. ed 2003.  
Review
translated into German by Elke Hentschel as Wissen und Erfahrung : feministische Praxis und poststrukturalistische Theorie 1991  
translated into Chinese by Xiaohong Bai as: 女性主義實踐與後結構主義理論 / Nu xing zhu yi shi jian yu hou jie gou zhu yi li lun 
translated into Korean as: 여성해방의 실천과 후기 구조주의 이론   
Feminism, Theory and the Politics of Difference (Blackwell Publishers, 1999).  
 Identity and Culture: Narratives of Difference and Belonging (Open University Press, 2004), 
Gender, Feminism and Fiction in Germany 1840-1914 (Peter Lang, 2007)  
Cultural politics : class, gender, race, and the postmodern world (with Glenn Jordan) B. Blackwell, 1995  
Review

Editor 
Die Frau in der DDR: An Anthology of Women's Writing from the German Democratic Republic ( B. Blackwell, 1988) 
Postwar Women's Writing in German: Feminist Critical Approaches (Berghahn Books, 1997).   
Review by R Rossi
Gendering Border Studies (with 	Jane Aaron; Henrice Altink) University of Wales Press, 2010

References

External links
 https://www.cardiff.ac.uk/people/view/135189-weedon-chris
https://www.vub.be/TALK/BBWW/index.php?id=36

1952 births
Living people
Academics of Cardiff University
Alumni of the University of Southampton
Alumni of the University of Birmingham